RF CMOS is a metal–oxide–semiconductor (MOS) integrated circuit (IC) technology that integrates radio-frequency (RF), analog and digital electronics on a mixed-signal CMOS (complementary MOS) RF circuit chip. It is widely used in modern wireless telecommunications, such as cellular networks, Bluetooth, Wi-Fi, GPS receivers, broadcasting, vehicular communication systems, and the radio transceivers in all modern mobile phones and wireless networking devices. RF CMOS technology was pioneered by Pakistani engineer Asad Ali Abidi at UCLA during the late 1980s to early 1990s, and helped bring about the wireless revolution with the introduction of digital signal processing in wireless communications. The development and design of RF CMOS devices was enabled by van der Ziel's FET RF noise model, which was published in the early 1960s and remained largely forgotten until the 1990s.

History

Pakistani engineer Asad Ali Abidi, while working at Bell Labs and then UCLA during the 1980s1990s, pioneered radio research in metal–oxide–semiconductor (MOS) technology and made seminal contributions to radio architecture based on complementary MOS (CMOS) switched-capacitor (SC) technology. In the early 1980s, while working at Bell, he worked on the development of sub-micron MOSFET (MOS field-effect transistor) VLSI (very large-scale integration) technology, and demonstrated the potential of sub-micron NMOS integrated circuit (IC) technology in high-speed communication circuits. Abidi's work was initially met with skepticism from proponents of GaAs and bipolar junction transistors, the dominant technologies for high-speed communication circuits at the time. In 1985 he joined the University of California, Los Angeles (UCLA), where he pioneered RF CMOS technology during the late 1980s to early 1990s. His work changed the way in which RF circuits would be designed, away from discrete bipolar transistors and towards CMOS integrated circuits.

Abidi was researching analog CMOS circuits for signal processing and communications at UCLA during the late 1980s to early 1990s. Abidi, along with UCLA colleagues J. Chang and Michael Gaitan, demonstrated the first RF CMOS amplifier in 1993. In 1995, Abidi used CMOS switched-capacitor technology to demonstrate the first direct-conversion transceivers for digital communications. In the late 1990s, RF CMOS technology was widely adopted in wireless networking, as mobile phones began entering widespread use. This changed the way in which RF circuits were designed, leading to the replacement of discrete bipolar transistors with CMOS integrated circuits in radio transceivers.

There was a rapid growth of the telecommunications industry towards the end of the 20th century, primarily due to the introduction of digital signal processing in wireless communications, driven by the development of low-cost, very large-scale integration (VLSI) RF CMOS technology. It enabled sophisticated, low-cost and portable end-user terminals, and gave rise to small, low-cost, low-power and portable units for a wide range of wireless communication systems. This enabled "anytime, anywhere" communication and helped bring about the wireless revolution, leading to the rapid growth of the wireless industry.

In the early 2000s, RF CMOS chips with deep sub-micron MOSFETs capable of over 100GHz frequency range were demonstrated. , the radio transceivers in all wireless networking devices and modern mobile phones are mass-produced as RF CMOS devices.

Applications
The baseband processors and radio transceivers in all modern wireless networking devices and mobile phones are mass-produced using RF CMOS devices. RF CMOS circuits are widely used to transmit and receive wireless signals, in a variety of applications, such as satellite technology (including GPS and GPS receivers), Bluetooth, Wi-Fi, near-field communication (NFC), mobile networks (such as 3G and 4G), terrestrial broadcast, and automotive radar applications, among other uses.

Examples of commercial RF CMOS chips include Intel's DECT cordless phone, and 802.11 (Wi-Fi) chips created by Atheros and other companies. Commercial RF CMOS products are also used for Bluetooth and Wireless LAN (WLAN) networks. RF CMOS is also used in the radio transceivers for wireless standards such as GSM, Wi-Fi, and Bluetooth, transceivers for mobile networks such as 3G, and remote units in wireless sensor networks (WSN).

RF CMOS technology is crucial to modern wireless communications, including wireless networks and mobile communication devices. One of the companies that commercialized RF CMOS technology was Infineon. Its bulk CMOS RF switches sell over 1billion units annually, reaching a cumulative 5billion units, .

Practical software-defined radio (SDR) for commercial use was enabled by RF CMOS, which is capable of implementing an entire software-defined radio system on a single MOS IC chip. RF CMOS began to be used for SDR implementations during the 2000s.

Common applications

RF CMOS is widely used in a number of common applications, which include the following.

See also

References

Digital electronics
Electronic design
Integrated circuits
MOSFETs
Pakistani inventions